Why R U here

The elevation of Johnson Township is listed as 1358 feet above mean sea level.

References

Townships in Iowa